Candido Erotico (also known as Copenhagen Nights, The Exhibitionist, A Man for Sale and Look at Me) is a 1978 Italian erotic romance-drama film written and directed by  Claudio Giorgi (here credited as Claudio De Molinis). Luigi Montefiori (aka George Eastman) co-wrote the screenplay.

Cast 

Lilli Carati: Charlotte
Mircha Carven: Carlo
María Baxa: Veronique
Marco Guglielmi: Paul
Fernando Cerulli: Voyeur on Train
Ajita Wilson: Sex Show Performer

References

External links

1978 films
Italian romantic drama films
Italian erotic drama films
Films set in Copenhagen
Films scored by Nico Fidenco
1970s erotic drama films
1978 romantic drama films
1970s Italian-language films
1970s Italian films